Fritz Bracht (18 January 1899 – 9 May 1945) was the Nazi Gauleiter of Gau Upper Silesia.

Career

After training as a gardener, Bracht entered military service in 1917, and was deployed at the front until the end of World War I. Thereafter, he found himself a prisoner of the British, until 1919.

On 1 April 1927, Bracht joined the Nazi Party with membership number 77,890 and was appointed leader of the NSDAP district of Sauerland in October 1928. He held the same position as of 1 March 1931 in Altena. Elected to the Prussian Landtag in April 1932, he was also elected to the Reichstag in November 1933. He was appointed to the post of Deputy Gauleiter of Gau Silesia on 1 May 1935, serving under Gauleiter Josef Wagner. He also served briefly as acting Deputy Gauleiter in Wagner's other jurisdiction, Gau Westphalia-South from 1 to 15 August 1936.

When Silesia was split into two Gaue, Upper Silesia and Lower Silesia on 27 January 1941, Bracht succeeded Wagner as the Gauleiter of the new Upper Silesia. He also succeeded to the position of Oberpräsident (High President) of the new Province of Upper Silesia, thus uniting under his control the highest party and governmental offices in the province. On 16 November 1942 he was named Reich Defense Commissioner in his Gau. On 20 April 1944, he was promoted to the rank of SA-Obergruppenführer. Within Bracht's jurisdiction was the concentration camp Auschwitz.

In 1944, with war threatening Silesia, Bracht ordered that air defence facilities in his Gau be upgraded and made stronger, however, he could not prevail upon the Armament Ministry to do so. Major offensives were launched against Upper Silesia beginning in January 1945 and hostilities continued in the area into May. As the Red Army marched into Silesia at the war's end, Bracht and his wife both committed suicide by poisoning themselves with potassium cyanide on 9 May 1945.

Decorations and awards
1914 Iron Cross, 1918
Golden Party Badge
Honour Chevron for the Old Guard, 1934
The Honour Cross of the World War 1914/1918 with Swords, 1934
Anschluss Medal, 1939
War Merit Cross 2nd Class without Swords and 1st Class without Swords, 1941
Golden Hitler Youth Badge with Oak Leaves, 22 September 1941

References

Bibliography
 Joachim Lilla (Bearbeiter): Statisten in Uniform. Die Mitglieder des Reichstags 1933–1945. Droste Verlag, Düsseldorf 2004, .
 Joachim Lilla (Bearbeiter): Die stellvertretenden Gauleiter und die Vertretung der Gauleiter der NSDAP im „Dritten Reich“. Wirtschaftsverlag NW, Bremerhaven 2003,  (= Materialien aus dem Bundesarchiv, Heft 13).

 
 Michael Rademacher: Handbuch der NSDAP-Gaue 1928–1945. Die Amtsträger der NSDAP und ihrer Organisationen auf Gau- und Kreisebene in Deutschland und Österreich sowie in den Reichsgauen Danzig-Westpreußen, Sudetenland und Wartheland. Lingenbrink, Vechta 2000, .
 Wolfgang Stelbrink: Die Kreisleiter der NSDAP in Westfalen und Lippe. Versuch einer Kollektivbiographie mit biographischem Anhang.  Nordrhein-Westfälisches Staatsarchiv, Münster 2003,  (= Veröffentlichungen der staatlichen Archive des Landes Nordrhein-Westfalen, Reihe C, Band 48).
 Mirosław Węcki: Fritz Bracht (1899–1945). Nazistowski zarządca Górnego Śląska w latach II wojny światowej. Katowice 2014, . 
Mirosław Węcki: Fritz Bracht - Gauleiter von Oberschlesien. Biographie (Paderborn: Brill / Ferdinand Schöningh, 2021), ISBN 978-3-506-70713-0

External links 

 
 Bild und Biografie im Handbuch des Reichstags
 

1899 births
1945 deaths
Gauleiters
German prisoners of war in World War I
Joint suicides by Nazis
Members of the Reichstag of Nazi Germany
German Army personnel of World War I
Nazi Party officials
Nazi Party politicians
Nazis who committed suicide in Germany
Suicides by cyanide poisoning
People from the Principality of Lippe
Prussian politicians
Sturmabteilung officers
1945 suicides
World War I prisoners of war held by the United Kingdom
People from Borken (district)